Club Deportivo Becerril is a football team based in Becerril de Campos in the autonomous community of Castile and León. Founded in 1977, it plays in the Tercera División – Group 8. Its stadium is Polideportivo Mariano Haro with a capacity of 2,000 seats.

Season to season

17 seasons in Tercera División

References

External links
Official blog
elportaldelfutbol.es.tl profile
Futbolme.com profile

Football clubs in Castile and León
Association football clubs established in 1977
1977 establishments in Spain
Province of Palencia